The 1960 San Francisco Giants season was the Giants' 78th year in Major League Baseball.  The team moved their home games from Seals Stadium to the new Candlestick Park.  In their third season in the Golden Gate City, the Giants finished in fifth place in the National League, 16 games behind the World Champion Pittsburgh Pirates. The Giants hit 62 triples, the most in the club's San Francisco era.

Offseason 
 November 30, 1959: Joey Amalfitano was drafted by the Giants from the Toronto Maple Leafs in the 1959 rule 5 draft.
 November 30, 1959: Jackie Brandt, Gordon Jones, and Roger McCardell were traded by the Giants to the Baltimore Orioles for Billy Loes and Billy O'Dell.
 November 30, 1959: Georges Maranda was drafted by the Giants from the Milwaukee Braves in the 1959 rule 5 draft.

Regular season

Season standings

Record vs. opponents

Opening Day starters 
Don Blasingame
Eddie Bressoud
Orlando Cepeda
Jim Davenport
Sam Jones
Willie Kirkland
Willie Mays
Willie McCovey
Bob Schmidt

Notable transactions
 April 1960: Don Taussig was purchased from the Giants by the Portland Beavers.
 May 12, 1960: Dave Philley was purchased by the Giants from the Philadelphia Phillies.
 September 1, 1960: Dave Philley was purchased from the Giants by the Baltimore Orioles.

Candlestick Park 
The Giants selected the name of Candlestick Park after a name-the-park contest on March 3, 1959. Prior to that, its construction site had been shown on maps as the generic Bay View Stadium. It was the first modern baseball stadium, as it was the first to be built entirely of reinforced concrete. Richard Nixon threw out the first baseball on the opening day of Candlestick Park on April 12, 1960, and called it the finest ballpark in the country.

Roster

Player stats

Batting

Starters by position 
Note: Pos = Position; G = Games played; AB = At bats; H = Hits; Avg. = Batting average; HR = Home runs; RBI = Runs batted in

Other batters 
Note: G = Games played; AB = At bats; H = Hits; Avg. = Batting average; HR = Home runs; RBI = Runs batted in

Pitching

Starting pitchers 
Note: G = Games pitched; IP = Innings pitched; W = Wins; L = Losses; ERA = Earned run average; SO = Strikeouts

Other pitchers 
Note: G = Games pitched; IP = Innings pitched; W = Wins; L = Losses; ERA = Earned run average; SO = Strikeouts

Relief pitchers 
Note: G = Games pitched; W = Wins; L = Losses; SV = Saves; ERA = Earned run average; SO = Strikeouts

Awards and honors 

All-Star Game, first game
All-Star Game, second game

Farm system 

LEAGUE CO-CHAMPIONS: Springfield

Notes

References 
 1960 San Francisco Giants team page at Baseball Reference
 1960 San Francisco Giants team page at Baseball Almanac

San Francisco Giants seasons
San Francisco Giants season
San Fran